Ramapo Reformed Church (formerly the Dutch Reformed Church at Romopock) is a historic church on Island Road at West Ramapo Avenue in Mahwah, Bergen County, New Jersey, United States. The church was built in 1798 and added to the National Register of Historic Places on September 5, 1985.

See also 
 National Register of Historic Places listings in Bergen County, New Jersey

References

External links
 View of Dutch Reformed Church at Romopock via Google Street View

Reformed Church in America churches in New Jersey
Churches on the National Register of Historic Places in New Jersey
Churches in Bergen County, New Jersey
Mahwah, New Jersey
National Register of Historic Places in Bergen County, New Jersey
New Jersey Register of Historic Places
1798 establishments in New Jersey